Charles T. Rathbun was an American architect who practiced in Pittsfield, Massachusetts during the second half of the nineteenth century.

Life and career
Rathbun was born in Pittsfield in 1828. His early life is unknown, but it is probable that he first trained as a carpenter. In the 1850s he went to New York, where he worked for ecclesiastical architect John W. Priest. Priest is known to have worked in the Pittsfield area, possibly explaining the connection. He had returned to Pittsfield by January 1858, a year before Priest's death. At that time he established himself as an architect, practicing alone. He worked as such until 1894, when he established a partnership with George C. Harding, Rathbun & Harding. The two remained together until 1899, when Rathbun retired. At this time, he was noted as probably being the oldest architect in Berkshire County. Harding practiced alone until 1901, when he established the notable local firm of Harding & Seaver.

On February 14, 1848, Rathbun married Mary Sharp in Pittsfield. He died there on July 22, 1908.

Legacy
As least two buildings designed by Rathbun have been individually placed on the National Register of Historic Places, and several others contribute to listed historic districts.

Architectural works

References

1828 births
1908 deaths
Architects from Pittsfield, Massachusetts